The Fatal Constancy is a 1723 tragedy by the British writer Hildebrand Jacob. The original cast included Barton Booth as Omphales, John Mills as Zimon, Colley Cibber as Tryphon, Charles Williams as Ammon and Mary Porter as Hesione.

References

Bibliography
 Black, Jeremy. Culture in Eighteenth-Century England: A Subject for Taste. A&C Black, 2007.
 Burling, William J. A Checklist of New Plays and Entertainments on the London Stage, 1700-1737. Fairleigh Dickinson Univ Press, 1992.

1723 plays
West End plays
Tragedy plays
Historical plays
Plays by Hildebrand Jacob